Cosmopterix coryphaea is a moth of the  family Cosmopterigidae. It is known from the Canary Islands and the Mediterranean region from Spain to Cyprus.

The wingspan is 9–10 mm.

The larvae feed on Phragmites australis. They mine the leaves of their host plant. The mine consists of a gallery, widening upwards into an elongate blotch. Most frass is piled in the older, lower section of the mine, but part of it is ejected. Pupation takes place inside of the mine.

References

coryphaea
Moths of Africa
Moths of Europe
Taxa named by Thomas de Grey, 6th Baron Walsingham
Moths described in 1908